The Seattle Mariners  season was their ninth since the franchise creation.

Regular season
 July 9: Against the Toronto Blue Jays at the Kingdome in Seattle, Jays catcher Buck Martinez executed a double play by tagging out two runners at home plate. In the third inning, Phil Bradley was on second when Gorman Thomas singled. Bradley was tagged out at home, on a throw from Jesse Barfield to Martinez with a collision in which Martinez broke his ankle; he was sitting on the ground in agony and threw the ball to third base in an attempt to tag out Thomas. The throw went into left field and Thomas continued running; left fielder George Bell threw the ball back to Martinez, still seated on the ground in pain, who tagged Thomas out.

Season standings

Record vs. opponents

Notable transactions
 June 3, 1985: Mike Schooler was drafted by the Mariners in the 2nd round of the 1985 Major League Baseball Draft.
 June 20, 1985: Mike Stanton was released by the Mariners.

Roster

Player stats

Batting

Starters by position
Note: Pos = Position; G = Games played; AB = At bats; H = Hits; Avg. = Batting average; HR = Home runs; RBI = Runs batted in

Other batters
Note: G = Games played; AB = At bats; H = Hits; Avg. = Batting average; HR = Home runs; RBI = Runs batted in

Pitching

Starting pitchers 
Note: G = Games pitched; IP = Innings pitched; W = Wins; L = Losses; ERA = Earned run average; SO = Strikeouts

Other pitchers 
Note: G = Games pitched; IP = Innings pitched; W = Wins; L = Losses; ERA = Earned run average; SO = Strikeouts

Relief pitchers 
Note: G = Games pitched; W = Wins; L = Losses; SV = Saves; ERA = Earned run average; SO = Strikeouts

Farm system

Notes

References 
1985 Seattle Mariners at Baseball Reference
1985 Seattle Mariners team page at www.baseball-almanac.com

Seattle Mariners seasons
Seattle Mariners season
Seattle Mariners